The Socialist Party (PS) is a moderate social-democratic political party in San Marino. The party was founded on 30 May 2012 as a merger of the New Socialist Party and Sammarinese Reformist Socialist Party.

During the Sammarinese election of 2012 the party joined the unsuccessful centrist coalition of the Agreement for the Country, even if the party itself obtained quite good results gaining 7 seats.

The party has been characterized as "friendly" by the former Foreign Minister of South Ossetia.

Electoral history

References

2012 establishments in San Marino
Political parties established in 2012
Political parties in San Marino
Pro-European political parties in San Marino
Social democratic parties in Europe